is a song by Chara, released as the first single from her 1997 album Junior Sweet. The song was used in a Shiseido commercial for their 'Tessera J' range. The B-side of this single, Junior Sweet, was also used in these commercials.

The song debuted at #10 on Oricon charts. Four weeks later, it reached its peak of #7. It stayed on the charts for 16 weeks, eventually selling approximately 520,000 copies.

In 2009, the pop/hiphop duo Halcali heavily sampled Yasashii Kimochi in their single Re:Yasashii Kimochi The new lyrics written by Halcali and their producer Pal@pop, act as an 'answer song' to the original lyrics.

Music video

The music video was shot by directorial pair Blaine & Justin. It centres around three differently dressed Charas. One is a white haired 'mannequin' who bangs a drum, one is a regularly dressed one who rides a merry-go-round, and the other is a dark-haired official who operates the ride. The video ends with the white haired Chara lit in blue with green antlers behind her.

As of August 24, 2019 the music video for Yasashii Kimochi has been viewed more than 3,400,000 times on popular video-sharing website YouTube.

Track listing

Single

Chart Rankings

Oricon Charts (Japan)

Cover versions
Halcali (2009, single Re:Yasashii Kimochi) (heavily sampled)
Marié Digby (2009, album Second Home)
Noelle (2008, album Love Electro)
Nao Toyama (2018, Tsuki ga Kirei, insert song)
Rie Takahashi (2019, Teasing Master Takagi-san 2 ending theme)

References

Chara (singer) songs
1997 singles
Japanese-language songs
1997 songs
Song recordings produced by Zentaro Watanabe